It's Very Stimulating is the debut EP by MC Paul Barman, released in 2000.

Critical reception
Nathan Rabin of AllMusic gave the EP 3 stars out of 5, saying, "Self-deprecating, whip-smart, and adventurous, Barman is a true hip-hop original, a brainy clown with a demented flow that suggests equally the scatological obsessions of Kool Keith and the anything-goes raunchiness of a borscht-belt comic." He added, "Ultimately, It's Very Stimulating is little more than a simultaneously tempting and frustrating appetizer for Barman's first album, a work that will go a long way toward determining whether Barman is indeed a forward-thinking hip-hop genius or just an over-educated novelty act with a good vocabulary and too much time on his hands." Ryan Kearney of Pitchfork gave the EP a 5.8 out of 10, saying, "Like wrapping a string around a dead bird, spinning it through the air, and seeing its body fly into the sunroof of a Le Car, MC Paul Barman is odd, funny, and mostly harmless."

Rolling Stone listed it on its "Top Fifty Albums of 2000" list. In 2013, Spin listed it on their "20 Dope Albums by Wack Rappers" list.

Track listing

Personnel
Credits adapted from liner notes.
 Prince Paul – production
 Skza – executive production
 Mike Fossenkemper – mastering
 Susan Now – design, photography
 MC Paul Barman – illustration
 Keith McCulloch – illustration

References

External links
 

2000 EPs
MC Paul Barman albums
Albums produced by Prince Paul (producer)